Pitcairnia tuberculata is a plant species in the genus Pitcairnia. This species is endemic to Venezuela.

References

tuberculata
Flora of Venezuela